Tom Nütten (born June 8, 1971) is a former American football guard who played eight seasons in the National Football League (NFL) with the St. Louis Rams. He was raised in Oelde, Germany and played high school football in Magog, Quebec and at Bishop's College School in Lennoxville, Quebec.

American football
He played college football at Champlain Lennoxville – Prep School located on the Bishop's University campus, also in Lennoxville, and at Western Michigan University in Kalamazoo, Michigan. 

He was drafted by the Bills in the seventh round of the 1995 NFL draft, but the Bills released him before the season started. Nütten spent the majority of his career with the Rams, where he started in two Super Bowls. In 2003, he joined the New York Jets but retired before ever playing a game. In 2004, he came out of retirement to finish his career with the Rams.

Personal life
Nütten lives in Florida with his wife, Allison, their two sons, Tyson and Tristan, and daughter, Nola. He currently owns a restaurant in Naples, FL called Lamoraga which is serving Tapas and international modern cuisine.

References

See also 
List of Bishop's College School alumni

1971 births
Living people
American football offensive guards
Buffalo Bills players
Hamilton Tiger-Cats players
Amsterdam Admirals players
St. Louis Rams players
New York Jets players
Players of American football from Ohio
Bishop's College School alumni
Western Michigan Broncos football players
German players of American football
Sportspeople from Toledo, Ohio